The Raven's Knot is the second book in the Tales from the Wyrd Museum series by Robin Jarvis. It was originally published in 1996.

Synopsis
In Glastonbury, there are two mysterious deaths and the women of the town are falling ill, and strange crow dolls are appearing in their houses. Back in London, Neil Chapman living in the Wyrd Museum (a strange building owned by the three mysterious Webster sisters) once more enters the 'Separate Collection,' and discovers a stuffed raven that has come back to life. Then one of the Webster sisters go missing, along with Edie Dorkins, the elfin girl brought out of the past to carry on the sisters' work.

1996 British novels
British fantasy novels
Novels by Robin Jarvis
Novels set in Somerset
HarperCollins books